Jes' Call Me Jim is a 1920 American comedy-drama film directed by Clarence G. Badger and written by Edward T. Lowe Jr. and Thompson Buchanan. It is based on the 1875 novel Seven Oaks by James G. Holland. The film stars Will Rogers, Irene Rich, Lionel Belmore, Raymond Hatton, Jimmy Rogers and Bert Sprotte. The film was released on May 23, 1920, by Goldwyn Pictures.

Cast       
Will Rogers as Jim Fenton
Irene Rich as Miss Butterworth
Lionel Belmore as Belcher
Raymond Hatton as Paul Benedict
Jimmy Rogers as Harry Benedict
Bert Sprotte as Buffum
Nick Cogley as Mike Conlin
Sidney De Gray as Sam Yates

Preservation status
A copy is preserved in the Museum of Modern Art collection, New York.

References

External links

1920s English-language films
Silent American comedy-drama films
1920 comedy-drama films
Goldwyn Pictures films
Films directed by Clarence G. Badger
American silent feature films
American black-and-white films
1920s American films